Folksongs for a Nuclear Village is the sixth studio album by new-age/jazz group Shadowfax, their first for Capitol Records. It won the Grammy Award for Best New Age Album  in 1989.

"Folksong for a Nuclear Village" was a 1982 dance performance choreographed by Louise Durkee of Seattle in that city.

The cover artwork is a piece by Michael McMillen called Nel Mezzo Del Cammin Di Nostra Vita, which is the opening line from The Divine Comedy, meaning, in English, "In the middle of our life's journey."

Track listing
 "The Firewalker" (Chuck Greenberg) – 4:54
 "We Used to Laugh" (Greenberg) – 4:07
 "Solar Wind" (David C. Lewis) – 5:08
 "Behind Green Eyes" (Phil Maggini) – 5:17
 "Lucky Mud" (Stuart Nevitt) – 4:40
 "Madagascar Cafe" (Nevitt, G. E. Stinson) – 3:06
 "Against the Grain" (Charles Bisharat) – 3:42
 "No Society" (Bisharat) – 4:16
 "Elephant Ego" (Lewis) – 5:00
 "Folksong for a Nuclear Village" (Maggini, Stinson) – 5:13

Personnel
Chuck Greenberg – Lyricon, tenor saxophone, soprano saxophone, alto, wood and clay flutes, double ocarina
Stuart Nevitt – cymbals, drums, E-mu SP-12/Pad 8 programming, gongs, timbales, caxixi, shakers, boobams, bamboo zither, shaman rattles, Bushman dance rattles, sampled dundago, clappers, kiwi drums, Moroccan clay drums, tambourines, bendir, gankogui, talking drum, log drums, congas
G. E. Stinson – electric and acoustic guitars, mbiras, accordion
Charles Bisharat – electric violin, violin, Yamaha DX7 synthesizer
David C. Lewis – Yamaha DX-7, Yamaha TX-7, Memorymoog synthesizer, E-mu Emax, sampled grand piano, Yamaha QX-I sequencer, Oberheim DX stretch drum machine
Phil Maggini – bass, fretless bass, string bass, Roland D-50 synthesizer, baby grand piano, bowed waterfone

Additional personnel
John Bergamo – tabla (3)
Emil Richards – marimba (1, 8), flapamba (1, 7), bass marimba (3, 6), jay call (3), E-11 sampled wind chimes (5), marimba (5), boobams (5), gamelan gongs (5), metal angklung (5), dumbeg (6), clappers (6), shekere (6), bamboo stamping tubes (7), angklung (7), primitive toms (7, 8), woodblock marimba (8), E-11 sampled didjeridu (10), bull roar (10), daka di bello (11), whistle (11)
Haralambi A. - sampled talking drum (9)
Michael Spiro –  percussion (2, 7, 9), conga (2, 7, 9)

Charts

References

Shadowfax (band) albums
1988 albums
Grammy Award for Best New Age Album
Albums produced by David Kershenbaum